The 1981 New York Cosmos season was the 11th season for the New York Cosmos in the now-defunct North American Soccer League. Despite winning their fifth straight premiership by five points over the Chicago Sting, the Cosmos lost to the Sting in Soccer Bowl '81.

Squad 

Source:

Results 
Source:

Friendlies

Preseason

Regular season 
Pld = Games Played, W = Wins, L = Losses, GF = Goals For, GA = Goals Against, Pts = Points
6 points for a win, 1 point for a shootout win, 0 points for a loss, 1 point for each goal scored (up to three per game).

Eastern Division Standings

Overall League Placing 

Source:

Matches 
March 29, 1981: New York Cosmos 3, San Jose Earthquakes 0 Spartan Stadium Attendance 20,671

Postseason

Overview

First round

Quarter-finals

Semi-finals

Soccer Bowl '81

Matches

References

See also
1981 North American Soccer League season
List of New York Cosmos seasons

New York
New York Cosmos seasons
New York
New York Cosmos